321st may refer to:

321st Air Expeditionary Group (321 AEG), a provisional United States Air Force Air Combat Command unit
321st Air Expeditionary Wing, a United States Air Force unit assigned United States Air Forces Central (USAFCENT)
321st Air Refueling Squadron, an inactive United States Air Force unit
321st Division (Imperial Japanese Army), active 23 May 1945–1945
321st Engineer Battalion (United States), Army Reserve battalion during World War II and Operation Iraqi Freedom
321st Field Artillery Regiment (FAR), a field artillery regiment of the United States Army
1st Battalion, 321st Field Artillery Regiment (1-321 FAR), an inactive field artillery battalion of the United States Army
2nd Battalion, 321st Field Artillery Regiment (2-321 FAR), an inactive field artillery battalion of the United States Army
3rd Battalion, 321st Field Artillery Regiment (3-321 FAR), an artillery battalion assigned to the 18th Field Artillery Brigade
321st Fighter-Interceptor Squadron, inactive United States Air Force unit
321st Missile Squadron, United States Air Force unit
321st Missile Wing LGM-30 Minuteman Missile Launch Sites Missile Alert Facilities and Launch Facilities
321st Rifle Division (Soviet Union), formed 1941 as a standard Red Army rifle division
321st Special Tactics Squadron, active ground unit within the 752d Special Operations Group, United States Air Force
321st Sustainment Brigade (United States), sustainment brigade of the United States Army Reserve

See also
321 (number)
321, the year 321 (CCCXXI) of the Julian calendar
321 BC